The four teams in this group played against each other on a home-and-away basis. The winner Soviet Union qualified for the eighth FIFA World Cup held in England.

Matches

 

 

 

 

 

 

 

 

 

 

 

Soviet Union qualified.

Final Table

Team stats

Head coach:  Nikolai Morozov

Head coach:  Dave Bowen

Head coach:  Lakis Petropoulos

Head coach:  Poul Petersen

External links
FIFA official page
RSSSF - 1966 World Cup Qualification
Allworldcup

7
1964 in Soviet football
1965 in Soviet football
1964–65 in Welsh football
1965–66 in Welsh football
1964–65 in Greek football
1965–66 in Greek football
1964 in Danish football
1965 in Danish football